The Man from Interpol (French: L'homme de l'Interpol) is a 1966 French crime film directed by Maurice Boutel and starring Hubert Noël, Donald O'Brien and Junie Astor.

Cast
 Hubert Noël as Alec Suller  
 Donald O'Brien as Polard  
 Junie Astor as Wanda  
 Chris Kersen  as Bradford  
 Silvia Solar as Lydia

References

Bibliography 
 Philippe Rège. Encyclopedia of French Film Directors, Volume 1. Scarecrow Press, 2009.

External links 
 

1966 films
1966 crime films
French crime films
1960s French-language films
Films directed by Maurice Boutel
1960s French films